This is a list of all head coaches for the Miami Hurricanes football team since the program's 1926 founding. 

During Miami's 91 seasons of playing football (1926 through 2016), 61 have been winning seasons; 25 were losing seasons, and for 5 seasons the team finished with a .500 record. In four seasons, Miami was undefeated and tie-free.

Key

Coaches
Statistics correct as of October 7, 2017.

Notes

References

 
Lists of college football head coaches
Miami-related lists
Florida sports-related lists